Sabellidites is a genus of annelid from the Ediacaran period. It is among the oldest annelid body fossils.

References

Annelids